Haris Tahirović (born 11 November 1981 in Sarajevo) is a Bosnian retired footballer who played as a forward.

Early life 
Tahirović was born in Sarajevo and grew up in Hamburg, Germany.

References 

1981 births
Living people
Footballers from Sarajevo
Footballers from Hamburg
Association football forwards
Bosnia and Herzegovina footballers
Eimsbütteler TV players
SC Concordia von 1907 players
BFC Siófok players
Calcio Foggia 1920 players
SV Sandhausen players
VfR Mannheim players
Serie C players
Oberliga (football) players
Bosnia and Herzegovina expatriate footballers
Expatriate footballers in Germany
Bosnia and Herzegovina expatriate sportspeople in Germany
Expatriate footballers in Hungary
Bosnia and Herzegovina expatriate sportspeople in Hungary
Expatriate footballers in Italy
Bosnia and Herzegovina expatriate sportspeople in Italy